The Maldives has remained an independent nation throughout its recorded history, save for a brief spell of Portuguese occupation in the mid-16th century.  From 1887 to 1965, the country was a British protectorate while retaining full internal sovereignty. At its independence in 1965, the Maldives joined the United Nations on 20 September.

Since 1978, the Maldives has followed a policy of international engagement, intensifying links with strategic partners and the international system. It joined the Commonwealth of Nations in 1982. A founder member of South Asian Association for Regional Cooperation (SAARC), the Maldives is also a member of the Bretton Woods system. It is also party to the Nuclear Non-Proliferation Treaty (NPT) as well as numerous conventions on the protection of the environment, the suppression of terrorism, disarmament and on the promotion and protection of human rights.

In the transition towards a liberal democracy, the Maldives has successfully established dialogue and collaboration with the international human rights organizations, such as Amnesty International and Human Rights Watch, and acceded to numerous human rights instruments such as the International Covenant on Civil and Political Rights (ICCPR) and the International Covenant on Economic, Social and Cultural Rights (ICESCR). During the same period, the country has also intensified links with the Commonwealth Parliamentary Association (CPA) and joined the Inter-Parliamentary Union (IPU).

The Maldives maintain resident diplomatic missions in Colombo, New Delhi, Islamabad, Dhaka, Singapore, Kuala Lumpur, New York, Tokyo, Beijing, Riyadh, London, Geneva, and the European Union, and non-resident accreditation in a number of countries including Nepal and Bhutan.

Key issues of interest include advancing national development, supporting international peace and security, including the protection of the environment and the promotion of human rights, and upholding the purposes and principles enshrined in the Charter of the United Nations.

Human rights

The Maldives has become a very strong advocate for the promotion and protection of human rights following the democratic transition in 2008. At the United Nations, the Maldives has since then called for all countries to adhere to their obligations under international law, and to respect fundamental freedoms and rights. In 2005, the Maldives became one of the promoters of the Optional Protocol to the UN Convention Against Torture after having earlier acceded to the convention. The Maldives is party to the Convention on the Rights of the Child (CRC), the Convention on the Elimination of Racial Discrimination (CERD), Convention on the Rights of Persons with Disabilities (CRPD) the Convention on the Elimination of All Forms of Discrimination Against Women (CEDAW) and its optional protocol. In April 2006, the Maldives issued a standing invitation to all special procedures mandates of the UN human rights machinery to visit to the Maldives.

The Maldives was elected to the Human Rights Council in 2010 for the term 2010–2013, in which it has actively supported and contributed to the promotion and protection of human rights for all. It has co-sponsored a number of resolution establishing United Nations Special Mandates, and supported resolutions on improving human rights situation in the Middle East during the Arab Spring, namely on investigating human rights violations in Libya and Syria.

Maldives has especially close relations with Sri Lanka and India, countries with which it shares much culture.

International organizations

United Nations

Maldives became a member state of the United Nations on 21 September 1965. The nation became a member of United Nations Development Programme (UNDP) on the same date.

The Maldives became a member of the following UN agencies and conferences on the following dates:
 United Nations Population Fund (UNFPA) and United Nations Conference on Trade and Development (UNCTAD) - 21 September 1965.
 United Nations Industrial Development Organization (UNIDO) -  5 May 1988
 United Nations Educational, Scientific and Cultural Organization (UNESCO) - 18 July 1980
 United Nations Environment Programme (UNEP) - on 15 December 1972
 United Nations Children's Fund (UNICEF) - 6 April 1971

The United Nations Development Programme has a representative resident in Malé, as do UNICEF and World Health Organization (WHO).

At the UN, the Maldives has highlighted the vulnerability of small states to various threats including terrorism, activities of mercenaries and transnational organized crime. It is also a strong advocate of counter-terrorism and is party to all the main UN conventions against terrorism. Development co-operation is a major priority of the Maldives and it has been campaigning at the UN for a more structured means of graduation from the list of least developed countries targeted for preferential assistance. The main donors to the Maldives are Japan, India, and Australia.

Other intergovernmental organizations

The Maldives became a member of Non-Aligned Movement on 15 August 1976.

The Maldives were a founder member in 1985 of the South Asian Association for Regional Cooperation (SAARC) and the nation plays a very active role in the association. It has taken the lead in calling for a South Asian Free Trade Agreement, the formulation of a Social Charter, the initiation of informal political consultations in SAARC forums, the lobbying for greater action on environmental issues, the proposal of numerous human rights measures such as the regional convention on child rights and for setting up a SAARC Human Rights Resource Centre. The Maldives is also an advocate of greater international profile for SAARC such as through formulating common positions at the UN. 

The Maldives is a member of the Organisation of Islamic Cooperation (OIC) and maintains close cultural relations with Islamic countries. However, the Maldives has often distanced itself from positions taken by the OIC on matters such as the Kashmir dispute, which it regards as a bilateral issue to be settled peacefully between India and Pakistan. It has also not supported the OIC position on issues such as that of Cyprus, subscribing instead to the international stance taken by the United Nations. The Maldives became a member of OIC in August 1974.

The Maldives and the Commonwealth of Nations

The Maldives joined the Commonwealth of Nations on 9 July 1982 as a special member and became a full member on 20 June 1985 

The Maldives became a member of the Commonwealth of Learning (COL) in September 1989, the Commonwealth Parliamentary Association (CPA) on 1 January 2000, the Commonwealth Fund for Technical Cooperation (CFTC) in 1985, and the Commonwealth Youth Programme (CYP) on 9 July 1982.

The Maldives withdrew from the Commonwealth in October 2016.

Ibrahim Mohamed Solih, the President of the Maldives and his Cabinet have decided that the Maldives will return to its membership of the Commonwealth, following in the footsteps of The Gambia under Adama Barrow's government, which returned to its membership of the Commonwealth on 8 February 2018.

The Maldives returned to its membership of the Commonwealth on 1 February 2020.

Diplomatic relations 

List of countries which Maldives has diplomatic relations with:

  – 26 July 1965
  – 26 July 1965
  – 1 November 1965
  – 10 November 1965
  – 1966
  – 5 July 1966
  – 26 July 1966
  – 14 September 1966
  – 30 November 1966
  – 14 November 1967
  – 1968
  – 12 February 1969
  – 20 May 1969
  – 12 October 1969
  – 14 June 1970
  – 15 September 1971
  – 14 October 1972
  – 25 January 1974
  – 12 July 1974
  – 2 September 1974
  – 10 October 1974
  – 20 February 1975
  – 1 March 1975
  – 24 May 1975
  – 20 June 1975
  – 15 November 1975
  – 17 November 1975
  – 29 January 1977
  – 3 October 1977
  – 1 December 1977
  – 1 March 1978
  – 15 March 1978
  – 21 August 1978
  –  22 September 1978
  – 28 May 1979
  – 21 June 1979
  – 25 August 1979
  – 3 September 1979
  – 1 November 1979
  – 4 March 1980
  – 1 July 1980
  – 1 August 1980
  – 16 October 1980
  – 1981
  – 15 January 1981
  – 15 February 1981
  – 20 February 1981
  – 17 March 1981
  – 25 March 1981
  – 10 June 1981
  – 23 June 1981
  – 4 December 1981
  – 4 April 1982
  – 8 November 1982
  – 8 April 1983
  – 20 July 1983
  – 10 September 1983
  – 17 September 1983
  – 26 March 1984
  – 31 March 1984
  – 26 May 1984
  – 13 July 1984
  – 14 August 1984
  – 1 October 1984
  – 1 October 1984
  – 1 November 1984
  – 5 March 1985
  – 6 November 1985
  –  7 January 1987
  – 1 March 1987
  – 14 May 1987
  – 1 November 1987
  – 27 January 1988
  – 4 February 1988
  – 25 February 1988
  – 8 March 1988
  – 10 March 1988
  – 15 March 1988
  – 14 June 1988
  – 11 July 1988
  – 11 August 1988
  – 22 August 1988
  – 27 September 1988
  – 22 September 1988
  – 6 February 1989
  – 1 March 1989
  – 20 March 1989
  – 3 July 1989
  – 10 July 1989
  – 1 August 1989
  – 10 August 1989
  – 16 October 1989
  – 18 October 1989
  – 30 November 1989
  – 30 January 1990
  – 26 February 1990
  – 26 July 1990
  – 1 November 1990
  – 24 October 1991
  – 16 December 1991
  – 25 September 1992
  – 1 January 1993
  – 27 January 1993
  – 20 April 1993
  – 2 August 1993
  – 17 August 1993
  – 31 August 1993
  – 28 September 1993
  – 6 October 1993
  – 30 November 1993
  – 6 December 1993
  – 22 March 1994
  – 14 April 1994
  – 20 June 1994
  – 27 July 1994
  – 7 December 1994
  – 10 January 1995
  – 9 February 1995
  – 21 September 1995
  – 23 October 1995
  – 27 November 1995
  – 4 March 1996
  – 27 January 1997
  – 8 April 1997
  – 2 December 1999
  – 7 December 1999
  – 11 February 2000
  – 15 March 2000
  – 9 May 2000
  – 13 July 2000
  – 13 November 2000
  – 19 March 2001
  – 25 March 2002
  – 26 November 2002
  – 23 April 2003
  – 27 May 2003
  – 21 July 2004
  – 14 March 2006
  – 17 March 2006
  – 15 June 2006
  – 20 March 2008
  – 7 April 2008
  – 19 May 2008
  – 25 June 2008
  – 23 October 2008
  – 24 February 2009
  – 15 April 2009
  – 24 November 2009
  – 24 November 2009
  – 11 March 2010
  – 17 March 2010
  – 11 May 2010
  – 21 September 2010
  – 28 September 2010
  – 21 January 2011
  – 14 March 2011
  – 16 September 2011
  – 13 October 2011
  – 2 December 2011
  – 29 December 2011
  – 10 February 2012
  – 14 May 2012
  – 24 April 2014
  – 17 October 2014
  – 21 September 2016
  – 19 September 2017
  – 1 April 2018
  – 13 April 2018
  – 20 April 2018
  – 21 May 2018
  – 24 May 2018
  – 6 August 2018
  – 31 May 2019
  – 6 September 2019
  – 10 November 2020
  – 15 December 2020
  – 10 February 2021
  – 29 March 2021
  – 21 January 2022
  – 5 April 2022
  – 22 September 2022
  – 22 September 2022

Suspended or severed diplomatic relations
 – 29 October 1965 (suspended)
 – 2 June 1975 (severed)

Bilateral relations

China 

China and Maldives established diplomatic relations on 14 October 1972. Sino-Maldivian economic cooperation and trade volume were for long insignificant, with total trade in 2002 of only US$3 million. Economic ties have recently become more important with large inflows of Chinese tourists to the Maldives since 2010.
Capital inflows from China have also rapidly increased since 2008. China's main exports to Maldives are rice and consumer goods. The relations between China and Maldives have increased in Mohamed Nasheed's presidential term. However, before being elected for president, Mohamed Nasheed criticized the Chinese Communist Party saying relations with Communist Chinese were never acceptable due to their views regarding modern democracy.
However under president Yaameen, both countries have developed a close relations. Chinese investments and Aid to Maldives increased. Best example of China - Maldives raising relations is the Chinese-Maldives friendship bridge.

India 

Bilateral relations between the Republic of India and the Republic of Maldives have been friendly and close in strategic, economic and military cooperation. India contributed to maintaining security on the island nation and has forged an alliance with respect to its strategic interests in the Indian Ocean.

India and Maldives officially and amicably decided their maritime boundary in 1976, although a minor diplomatic incident occurred in 1982 when the brother of the President of Maldives Maumoon Abdul Gayoom declared that the neighbouring Minicoy Island that belonged to India were a part of Maldives; Maldivies quickly and officially denied that it was laying claim to the island. India and Maldives signed a comprehensive trade agreement in 1981. Both nations are founding members of the South Asian Association for Regional Cooperation (SAARC), the South Asian Economic Union and signatories to the South Asia Free Trade Agreement. Indian and Maldivian leaders have maintained high-level contacts and consultations on regional issues.

Diplomatic relations between Maldives and India were established on 1 November 1965.43

Malaysia 

The Malaysian High Commission in Colombo is also cross-accredited to the Maldives, and Maldives has a high commission in Kuala Lumpur.

Myanmar 

Maldives and Myanmar established diplomatic relations on 15 January 1970.40 In September 2017, the Ministry of Foreign Affairs of the Maldives announced that it was ceasing all trade ties with Myanmar in response to the government's treatment of the Rohingya people in Rakhine State.

Pakistan 

In November 2004, Pakistan Prime Minister Shaukat Aziz visited the Maldives and met with President Maumoon Abdul Gayoom. Aziz offered to extend credit facility, scholarships, collaboration in scientific and technological fields and training of civil servants, defence and security personnel to Maldives. In October 2005, Pakistan-Maldives Joint Economic Commission commenced.

South Korea 

The establishment of diplomatic relations of Maldives and South Korea were on 30 November 1967 and Bilateral Trade in 2012 was Exports $3.67 million Imports $380 thousand.

Sri Lanka 

Official and economic relations between the neighbouring Indian Ocean countries of the Maldives and Sri Lanka, have been positive since the Maldives became independent in 1965. The Maldives first established a mission in Sri Lanka in July 1965, and today has a High Commission in Colombo. Sri Lanka has a high commission in Malé. Both countries were founding members of the South Asian Association for Regional Cooperation (SAARC) in December 1985. On 13 February 2014 Zahiya Zareer was appointed by President Abdulla Yameen as High Commissioner to Sri Lanka.

The Maldives has an embassy in Bangkok and Thailand is accredited to the Maldives via its embassy in Colombo, Sri Lanka

Middle East

Israel

The Maldives established diplomatic relations with Israel in 1965 and suspended them in 1974.

In 2009, under president Mohamed Nasheed, the Maldives signed cooperation agreements with Israel on tourism, health, and education and culture. In 2010, the Israeli government sent a team of eye doctors to treat patients and train local medical personnel in the Maldives. However, the renewed relationship did not develop into full diplomatic relations.

In July 2014, under president Abdulla Yameen, the Maldives terminated the cooperation agreements with Israel and announced a boycott of Israeli products, as Israel launched a military operation in Gaza. Foreign minister Dunya Maumoon also announced that the Maldives would fully support Palestinians at international forums such as the United Nations Human Rights Council and offer them humanitarian aid.

Saudi Arabia

On 12 May 2008, the Maldivian embassy was opened in Riyadh which was the first Maldivian mission in the Middle East.42

Africa

Mauritius

Both the Maldives and Mauritius were former British Indian Ocean possessions, and both now have similar tourist-oriented economies. Relations between the two islands are friendly, and there is some economic cooperation.

North and South America

United States

The Maldives established diplomatic relations with the United States on 10 November 1965 and the two nations maintain friendly relations.

The U.S. ambassador to Sri Lanka, based in the U.S. embassy in Colombo, is also cross-accredited to the Maldives, and the ambassador and embassy staff make periodic visits. The United States supports Maldivian independence and territorial integrity, and publicly endorsed India's timely intervention on behalf of the Maldivian Government during the 1988 Maldives coup d'état attempt. U.S. Navy vessels have regularly called at Malé in recent years. The Maldives extended strong support to U.S. efforts to combat terrorism and terrorist financing in 2001–2002.

Europe

Cyprus

Cyprus and the Maldives do maintain diplomatic relations. 
Both countries established diplomatic relations on 1 November 1997.
Cyprus is represented in Maldives by its embassy in New Delhi, India.
Both countries are full members of Commonwealth of Nations.

Finland

Finland recognized the Maldives on 15 October 1965. Diplomatic relations between Maldives and Finland were established on 10 August 1984.

Germany 

The Maldives and the Federal Republic of Germany established diplomatic relations in 1966.

Greece

Both countries established diplomatic relations on 6 December 1983. 
Greece is represented in Sri Lanka by ts embassy in New Delhi, India. 
Maldives have an honorary consulate in Athens.

Kosovo

The Maldives recognized Kosovo on 19 February 2009. On 16 April 2009, Kosovo and the Maldives established diplomatic relations with one another.

On 7 March, the then Maldivian President Mohamed Nasheed asked police to investigate the allegations of a US$2 million bribe given to Maldivian government officials to recognise Kosovo as an independent state. On 17 March, People's Majlis National Security Committee launched probe into Islamic Democratic Party's allegations regarding the bribery. Balkan Insight reported that Kosovo businessman, Behgjet Pacolli, who also heads the New Kosovo Alliance party, has denied any involvement in the bribery case and stated that he only lobbied for the recognition of Kosovo. Foreign Minister Ahmed Shaheed was cross-examined by the parliamentary committee on 28 March. The police investigation was closed on 6 May 2009, concluding that there was no evidence of corruption and the diplomatic process was conducted according to international standards; the NSC investigation was suspended.

Turkey

Both countries established diplomatic relations on 28 May 1979.

United Kingdom

The Maldives became a British Protectorate in the 19th century and the Maldivian monarchs were granted a good measure of self-governance. The Maldives gained total independence in 1965. The maritime border with the British Indian Ocean Territory (BIOT) remains undemarcated, with negotiations with the UK being broken off by the Maldives in the late 1990s.

Embassies and High Commissions of the Maldives

The following is a list of the current Ambassadors and High Commissioners of the Maldives with their assigned host country:-

See also
 List of diplomatic missions in the Maldives
 List of diplomatic missions of the Maldives
 Maldives and the World Bank

References

External links 

 Maldives Foreign Ministry
 Miadhu

 
Maldives and the Commonwealth of Nations